Bradina aurata is a moth in the family Crambidae. 
It has a wing length of 8mm and is mostly pale-yellowish.
It was described by Arthur Gardiner Butler in 1887. It is found on the Solomon Islands and West-Malaysia.

References

Moths described in 1887
Bradina